AXN Action Awards, has tied up with Thums Up to create a platform to give ‘Action’ stars credit through the first on-air Action Award event in India.

History
The first awards were presented in 2006.  The awards given are different five categories. The winner is selected by public vote.

Awards

Best Action film

Best Action Director

Best Action Actor

Best Action Actor in a Negative Role

Best Action Sequence

Records
Most award to a single action film
Dabangg (2010) - 5
Shootout at Lokhandwala (2007) - 4
Wanted (2009) - 3
Most action actings awards (Best Action Actor + Best Actor in a Negative Rola)
Salman Khan - (2+0) = 2
Akshay Kumar - (1+1) = 2
Hrithik Roshan - (1+1) = 2
Most action sequence awards
Allan Amin - 2
Vijayan Master - 2

References

External links 
 Official site

AXN
Indian film awards
Sony Pictures Networks India
Awards established in 2006
2006 establishments in Maharashtra